Philadelphia Phoenix may refer to:

 Philadelphia Phoenix (AUDL), an ultimate team in the American Ultimate Disc League
 Philadelphia Firebirds (IWFL), a women's football team in the Independent Women's Football League